Phedimus kamtschaticus, the orange stonecrop, is a species of flowering plant in the family Crassulaceae. It is native to China, Korea, Japan and the Russian Far East north to Chukotka, and has been introduced to the state of New York, Norway, Germany, Austria, and the Baltic States.

Under its synonym Sedum kamtschaticum it has gained the Royal Horticultural Society's Award of Garden Merit. In addition, the putative variety Sedum kamtschaticum var. ellacombeanum and the 'Variegatum' cultivar have also gained the award.

References

Crassulaceae
Flora of North-Central China
Flora of Inner Mongolia
Flora of Manchuria
Flora of Korea
Flora of Japan
Flora of the Russian Far East
Plants described in 1995